The Looney Tunes and Merrie Melodies series of animated shorts released by Warner Bros. feature a range of characters which are listed and briefly detailed here. Major characters from the franchise include Bugs Bunny, Daffy Duck, Elmer Fudd, Foghorn Leghorn, Granny, Lola Bunny, Marvin the Martian, Pepé Le Pew, Porky Pig, Speedy Gonzales, Sylvester the Cat, the Tasmanian Devil (Taz), Tweety, Wile E. Coyote and the Road Runner, and Yosemite Sam. This list does not include characters from Looney Tunes related television series, like Tiny Toon Adventures characters, Duck Dodgers characters, or Loonatics Unleashed characters.

Recurring  characters 

The following is a list of characters who appear in at least 2 different types of Looney Tunes media. Cameos are not included.

List

The following is a list of recurring Looney Tunes and Merrie Melodies characters without an own article.

Blacque Jacque Shellacque

Blacque Jacque Shellacque is a fictional cartoon character in the Looney Tunes cartoons. He was created by Robert McKimson and Tedd Pierce, and first appeared in the 1959 Merrie Melodies short Bonanza Bunny set in the Klondike of 1896. Maurice LaMarche voiced the character from 2011 to 2014 in The Looney Tunes Show. The character was the inspiration for a specific version of five card draw poker mixed with blackjack named "Blacque Jacque Shellacque" in which the pot is divided between the winning poker hand and the winning blackjack hand. If everyone loses in blackjack, the winning poker hand takes all.

While similar in many ways to Yosemite Sam—both are short in stature and temper—Blacque Jacque possesses his own unique characteristics, not the least of which is his comically thick French Canadian accent, performed by Mel Blanc.  Also, like Yosemite Sam and many other villains, Blacque Jacque Shellacque does not have a high level of intelligence, preferring to use force instead of strategy to fight Bugs.  His usual swear word is Sacrebleu; and he is often portrayed as a thief.

Bunny and Claude

Bunny and Claude are two fictional cartoon characters in the Looney Tunes series by Warner Bros. Cartoons which debuted in 1968. They are based on the real-life Bonnie and Clyde and the then-recent film about the pair's life that had been released by Warner Bros.

They are depicted as a romantically involved pair of well-dressed rabbits who pull off carrot heists, and their catchphrase is "We rob carrot patches", based on the film Bonnie and Clyde's "We rob banks". Bunny was voiced by Pat Woodell and Claude was voiced by veteran Looney Tunes voice actor Mel Blanc. They both speak with pronounced Southern accents. Bunny and Claude are pursued by a stereotypical Southern sheriff (also voiced by Blanc in a fashion similar to his other characters, Foghorn Leghorn and Yosemite Sam).

They appeared in two cartoons produced by Warner Bros.-Seven Arts Animation, Bunny and Claude (We Rob Carrot Patches), released in 1968, and The Great Carrot Train Robbery, released in 1969. Both films were directed by Robert McKimson, and were his first two cartoons he directed in his comeback to Termite Terrace.

Gabby Goat

Gabby Goat is an animated cartoon character in the Warner Bros. Looney Tunes series of cartoons.

Bob Clampett created Gabby, a loud and temperamental cynic, to be a sidekick for Porky Pig in the 1937 short Porky and Gabby, directed by Ub Iwerks, who briefly subcontracted to Leon Schlesinger Productions, producers of the Looney Tunes shorts.  The cartoon focuses on the title characters' camping trip, which is foiled by car trouble.

Gabby made only two other golden-age animated appearances in Get Rich Quick Porky and Porky's Badtime Story, although he did briefly appear in early merchandise as well. The series New Looney Tunes  revived the character of Gabby.

K-9

K-9 is Marvin the Martian's pet alien dog. He is a dog with green fur, and like his owner, he wears a helmet, skirt, and four slippers. K-9 debuts in Haredevil Hare (1948), where he and his owner Marvin tried to defeat Bugs Bunny. He returns in The Hasty Hare (1952), serving the same purpose. He returns in The Hasty Hare, serving the same purpose. After that, he did not appear in another short film until Marvin the Martian in the Third Dimension (1996), where he and Marvin confront Daffy Duck.

In the television series Duck Dodgers, K-9 appears as the pet of Martian Commander X-2 (Marvin's alternate character in the series), having major roles in the episodes "K-9 Kaddy" and "K9 Quarry". He has also had cameo appearances in other Looney Tunes related television series: Marvin and him make a cameo appearance at the end of the episode "What's the Frequency, Kitty?" from The Sylvester & Tweety Mysteries; K-9 appears sleeping next to Marvin and Minerva Mink while they have a date in the episode "Star Warners" from Pinky and the Brain; in The Looney Tunes Show, K-9 has a cameo in the musical video "I'm a Martian" from the episode "Members Only". In Loonatics Unleashed, the character Sergeant Sirius is a robot dog based on him, being the pet of Melvin the Matian, a descendant of Marvin.

K-9 makes a cameo appearance in the film Space Jam, as part of the audience during the basketball game. He has a minor but most notable appearance in the film Space Jam: A New Legacy, where after Bugs claims Tune World in the name of the Earth, he appears alongside Marvin, who arrives to claim Tune World in the name of Mars.

K-9 also appears as a playable character in the mobile game Looney Tunes World of Mayhem.

Melissa Duck

Melissa Duck is a blonde female mallard duck, and girlfriend to Daffy Duck; and was created by Frank Tashlin and Chuck Jones. She is featured in several cartoon shorts, but is only referred to as Melissa in one, The Scarlet Pumpernickel, where she is voiced by Marian Richman. A baby version appeared in Baby Looney Tunes as part of the main cast.

History
In the 1945 cartoon Nasty Quacks, Daffy's owner, a young girl, also becomes the besotted owner of a small, yellow duckling. When a jealous Daffy feeds the duckling growth pills, he is surprised to see it age into a white, female duck with blonde hair. By the end of the cartoon, the two have fallen in love and given birth to roughly ten black, white, and yellow ducklings of their own. The blonde duck in this cartoon bears visual similarities to Daffy's girlfriend from 1953's Muscle Tussle and may represent the "origin" of the Melissa Duck character.

Melissa Duck first officially appeared by name in adult form in the 1950 short The Scarlet Pumpernickel which was, in 1994, voted number 31 of the 50 Greatest Cartoons of all time by members of the animation field. In the cartoon, she appears as a blonde damsel-in-distress and Daffy's love interest. The plot followed Daffy attempting to save "the Fair Lady Melissa" from having to marry the evil Grand Duke Sylvester with whom she is not in love. Femme Fatale (aka "The Body", also referred to as Fowl Fatale or Shapely Lady Duck), from the 1952 Daffy Duck cartoon The Super Snooper, was a tall voluptuous bright blue-eyed, redheaded duck wearing red lipstick who bears a strong resemblance to Melissa Duck. Later in Robert McKimson's Muscle Tussle (1953), Daffy Duck's girlfriend appears with him on a visit to the beach. Melissa appeared again as a possessed client of Daffy's paranormal investigations business in The Duxorcist, originally released as part of Daffy Duck's Quackbusters in 1988.

Melissa Duck's most notable role is from the series Baby Looney Tunes which debuted in 2001 and casts the adult characters from the original Looney Tunes theatrical shorts as their infant selves, and displays Melissa's crush on Daffy Duck when she was an infant. In 2011 The Looney Tunes Show introduced a new female duck character, Tina Russo, based on Melissa Duck.

In 2021, Melissa Duck reappeared as a playable character in the mobile game Looney Tunes World of Mayhem titled the "Fair Lady Melissa," "Maid Melissa" and "Possessed Melissa."

Pete Puma

Pete Puma is a puma, originally voiced by Stan Freberg. He was created by Robert McKimson, and debuted in the November 15, 1952 short film Rabbit's Kin.  Although Pete Puma was a one-shot character in Rabbit's Kin, he is often vividly remembered by cartoon fans, especially for his bizarre, inhaled, almost choking laugh (based on comedian Frank Fontaine's "Crazy Guggenheim" and "John L.C. Silvoney" characters). In Rabbit's Kin, Pete is chasing a young rabbit called "Shorty" who asks Bugs Bunny for help. Bugs is eager to oblige and subjects Pete to some of his trademark pranks.

Pete Puma has made occasional appearances on Tiny Toon Adventures (as the Acme Looniversity janitor), some episodes of The Sylvester and Tweety Mysteries, co-starred with Foghorn Leghorn in Pullet Surprise (voiced again by Freberg in all of these appearances), made a cameo appearance in the crowd scenes of Space Jam, Carrotblanca (as a waiter), Tweety's High-Flying Adventure (as one of the felines around the world whose pawprints Tweety collects, voiced again by Freberg), Bah, Humduck! A Looney Tunes Christmas (working as a janitor again), and is a supporting character in the Looney Tunes comic books. Pete (voiced by John Kassir) is a recurring character in The Looney Tunes Show as Daffy Duck's dimwitted friend, and working various jobs around town. In the Looney Tunes Cartoons shorts he appears in "Puma Problems" and "Bottoms Up", where he is voiced by Stephen Stanton.

Rocky and Mugsy

Rocky and Mugsy are animated cartoon characters in the Warner Bros. Looney Tunes and Merrie Melodies series of cartoons. They were created by Friz Freleng.

Biography
As an animator, Friz Freleng enjoyed creating new adversaries for Warners' star Bugs Bunny, since he felt that Bugs' other nemeses, such as Beaky Buzzard and Elmer Fudd (who actually appeared in many more Freleng shorts than is commonly realized), were too stupid to give the rabbit any real challenge. Though considered revolutionary for almost all of the late 1940s, Freleng's own Yosemite Sam had not yet been proven capable of fully fulfilling his creator's intentions. Freleng introduced two of these more formidable opponents as a pair of gangsters in the 1946 film Racketeer Rabbit, written by Michael Maltese. In the film, Bugs decides to find himself a new home, but the one he chooses is unfortunately occupied by a duo of bank robbers. The characters here are called "Rocky" (drawn like movie gangster Edward G. Robinson) and "Hugo" (a caricatured Peter Lorre). Both gangsters are performed by the Warner studio's longtime chief voice actor, Mel Blanc.

Appearances
Freleng liked the mobster idea, and he used the concept again in the 1950 short Golden Yeggs. This time, it is Porky Pig and Daffy Duck who run afoul of the mob, only this time Rocky has not only one sidekick, but an entire gang. Freleng also redesigned Rocky for this short, making him a more generalized caricature of the "tough guy" gangster rather than Robinson in particular. Freleng used several of the same techniques that would make Sam, his other Bugs villain, such a humorous character: despite Rocky's tough-guy demeanor, everlasting cigar (or cigarette) and foppish gangster dress, he really is little more than a dwarf in a much-too-large hat.

In 1953's Catty Cornered, Freleng set the mob against another of his comic duos, Sylvester and Tweety Bird. Gang leader Rocky, this time aided and abetted by a hulking simpleton named "Nick", kidnaps Tweety Bird, and when Sylvester's bumbling predations accidentally free the bird, the poor puss is hailed as a hero.

The duo reappear in 1954's Bugs and Thugs, this time in the form that Freleng would keep them in for the rest of their run. Rocky is aided by a new thug, "Mugsy". Although his body type is similar to that of Nick's, he has less hair and is even less intelligent. Before the Warner studio closed for good in 1963, Rocky and Mugsy would appear in two more Freleng cartoons: Bugsy and Mugsy (1957) and The Unmentionables (1963). Mugsy also appears without his boss in a cameo as one of Napoleon Bonaparte's guards in the 1956 Freleng short Napoleon Bunny-Part and also appeared as a bank robber in Satan's Waitin'.

Rocky and Mugsy have also appeared in various Looney Tunes-related merchandise. They are semi-regular characters in Looney Tunes comic books, for example. They also play the villains in the 2002 Xbox video game Loons: The Fight for Fame, a vs. fighting game in which the no-good gangsters attempt to run a film studio into the ground so that they can buy up the stock for next to nothing. Also, in Bugs Bunny Lost in Time, the pair are bosses of the 1930s era. They also appeared in episodes of The Sylvester and Tweety Mysteries and Duck Dodgers, as well as various cameo appearances in the movie Space Jam. In the movie, they are spotted wearing rabbit's ears and are shown shocked and terrified when Bugs gets crushed by a Monstar named Pound who was meant to crush Lola. Rocky and Mugsy both made a cameo appearance in the sequel Space Jam: A New Legacy were they are seen in line with the other Tunes leaving Tune World in Bugs Bunny's flashback.

Rocky and Mugsy made cameos in The Looney Tunes Show. In "It's a Handbag", Rocky and Mugsy's pictures were seen in the police's notebook. They were also seen in the Merrie Melodies segment "Stick to My Guns", sung by Yosemite Sam in the episode "Mrs. Porkbunny's" where Yosemite Sam mentions how he declared his vendetta on the Mafia when Sam threw a garbage can into their house. Around the end of the song, Rocky and Mugsy joined in on the final verse with Nasty Canasta, an angry bride, a female cannibal, a grizzly bear, and Toro the Bull.

Rocky and Mugsy appear in the Looney Tunes Cartoons shorts "Chain Gang(sters)" and "Hideout Hare" with Rocky voiced by James Adomian and Mugsy voiced by Fred Tatasciore.

Shorts
 Racketeer Rabbit (1946) – Features a prototype of Rocky.
 Golden Yeggs (1950) – Rocky's first cartoon, only cartoon paired with Daffy Duck and Porky Pig.
 Catty Cornered (1953) – Only pairing with Sylvester and Tweety.
 Bugs and Thugs (1954) – Mugsy's first cartoon.
 Napoleon Bunny-Part (1956) – Mugsy cameos as a guard.
 Bugsy and Mugsy (1957) 
 The Unmentionables (1963) – Final appearance of Rocky and Mugsy.

Parodies
In the televsion series Loonatics Unleashed, the characters Stoney and Bugsy are two gangsters descendants of Rocky and Mugsy, being very similar to them in appearance. 

Rocky and Mugsy are parodied as the South Park characters Nathan and Mimsy in the episode "Crippled Summer", Nathan having been introduced in the earlier episode "Up the Down Steroid". Throughout the episode's storylines, with various campers being parodies of other Looney Tunes characters, Nathan (Rocky) attempts to arrange fatal accidents for Jimmy Valmer (a counterpart to Bugs Bunny) which get ruined by Mimsy (Mugsy)'s stupidity. Nathan and Mimsy become reoccurring characters following their return appearance in the episode "Handicar". A poster depicting Rocky and Mugsy can be seen on the wall of Nathan's room.

Notes

References

External links

Lists of characters in American television animation
 
Lists of animated film characters
Lists of Warner Bros. characters